Statistics of Latvian Higher League in the 1975 season.

Overview
It was contested by 12 teams, and VEF won the championship.

League standings

References
 RSSSF

Latvian SSR Higher League
Football 
Latvia